This is a list of bridges and tunnels on the National Register of Historic Places in the U.S. state of Maine.

Bridges removed from the register

References

 
Maine
Bridges
Bridges